Xhosa may refer to:
 Xhosa people, a nation, and ethnic group, who live in south-central and southeasterly region of South Africa
 Xhosa language, one of the 11 official languages of South Africa, principally spoken by the Xhosa people

See also 
 
 Khosa (disambiguation)
 Kosa (disambiguation)

Language and nationality disambiguation pages